Taganrog Bay is the northeastern arm of the Sea of Azov. It also may be perceived as a flooded estuary of the Don River.

Geography
The bay serves as a natural boundary between the Kuban coast line in Russia and the northern Azov littoral region in Ukraine and Russia. Since the fall of the Soviet Union, the international boundary here hasn't been established.

At its northeast end is the mouth of the Don River. It may freeze some winters from December to March.

Three other rivers, the Kalmius, Mius and the Yeya, flow into the bay. The flow of water into the bay is the chief factor for current development in the Sea of Azov.

Landforms
Its mouth is marked by the Dolgaya Spit on the south and the Bilosaray Spit (Bilosarayska Spit) on the north. It abounds in sandy spits that partly enclose shallow bays. The bay contains "Sandy Isles" (Песчаные острова, Пісчані острови).

The major ports are Taganrog, Mariupol (Ukraine), and Yeysk. Rostov-on-Don is a few miles up the Don river.

Water
The concentration of salt water in the Gulf is uneven. East, the most shallow part of the bay, which receives water directly to Don desalinized, and the westernmost osolonena, as is often subjected to the direct effects of Azov water. Taganrog Yeisk in Russia and Mariupol in Ukraine are the main ports of Taganrog Bay.

One strange phenomenon is the presence of both fresh and salt water in the bay. The water in the eastern and shallower part of the bay, which receives water from the Don River, is mostly desalinized. The western end of the bay is completely salt water.

See also
Don River Basin

References

External links

Bays of the Sea of Azov
Bays of Ukraine
Russia–Ukraine border
Bays of Krasnodar Krai
Bodies of water of Rostov Oblast
Don basin